Platysteira is a genus of bird in the family Platysteiridae. 
It contains the following species:
 Black-throated wattle-eye, Platysteira peltata
 Black-necked wattle-eye, Platysteira chalybea
 Banded wattle-eye, Platysteira laticincta
 Chestnut wattle-eye, Platysteira castanea
 West African wattle-eye, Platysteira hormophora
 Brown-throated wattle-eye, Platysteira cyanea
 Jameson's wattle-eye, Platysteira jamesoni
 Red-cheeked wattle-eye, Platysteira blissetti
 White-fronted wattle-eye, Platysteira albifrons
 White-spotted wattle-eye, Platysteira tonsa
 Yellow-bellied wattle-eye, Platysteira concreta

 
Platysteiridae
Bird genera
Taxonomy articles created by Polbot